South Pond is a village in Plymouth, Massachusetts, United States. It is located east of Great South Pond, a reservoir that serves as one of Plymouth's municipal water sources. The village is located north of Myles Standish State Forest, northwest of Long Pond, southwest of Chiltonville and west of  Route 3. Plymouth's main Post Office, the Plymouth Community Intermediate School, The Grove at Plymouth, and the Plymouth Town Forest are located directly north of the village. South Pond Chapel (also known as Union Chapel) and South Pond Cemetery, a small cemetery, are located within the village. The town suffers from extremely high rates of poverty as 93.6% of the population lives below the poverty line. This is mainly because it was originally founded as a slum for the laborers of the wealthy factory owner Michael Finsley in 1849.

Villages in Plymouth, Massachusetts
Villages in Massachusetts